The Laughing Samoans were a New Zealand-based duo formed by comedians Eteuati Ete and Tofiga Fepulea'i, both of Samoan descent. The duo have toured in New Zealand in sold-out shows and internationally to Australia, United States, the Cook Islands, Hawai'i, Fiji and England in 2009.

Their first show as a duo was called A Small Samoan Wedding, and toured around New Zealand in 2004 before travelling overseas. Since then, they have toured with a new show almost every year: 
Laughing with Samoans (2003)
A Small Samoan Wedding (2004)
Old School (2005)
Off Work (2006)
Crack Me Off (2008)
Prettyful Woman (2009)
Choka-Block (2010)
Greatest Hits (2011)
Funny Chokers (2012)
Fobulous (2013)
Fresh Off da Blane (2014)
Fink About It (2015)
Island Time! (2016)

Ending
On 5 December 2016, Ete posted on their website that the Laughing Samoans will not be producing another touring show for the foreseeable future.

It is not clear from Ete's post, if the duo has disbanded or if they are simply, taking a break.

References

External links
Laughing Samoans website
Mau Forum 2009 show
Bloomsbury Theatre show 2009

New Zealand comedy duos
Comedy theatre characters
Theatre characters introduced in 2004
Samoan-New Zealand culture